Inga Gaile (born 29 June 1976, in Riga, Latvia) is a Latvian poet, novelist, and playwright.

Biography
Gaile has written poetry collection for adults and children. Her works often focus on feminist issues and as well as issues related to different stigmatised groups. She has won the Latvian Literature Award and the Poetry Days Festival prize. Gaile has translated poetry from Russian into Latvian, and her poems have also been translated into various languages including English, Estonian, German, Swedish, Lithuanian, and Bengali.
She is President of Latvia PEN.

Activism
Inga Gaile is an prominent member of the Latvian feminist movement and is a founder of the stand-up comedy group "Sieviešu stendaps/Women's Stand-Up".

Works

Poetry
Laiks bija iemīlējies (Time Had Grown Enamoured). Rīga: Pētergailis, 1999.
Raudāt nedrīkst smieties (Cry Not Laugh). Rīga: Nordik, 2004.
Kūku Marija (Maria, the Cake Killer). Rīga: Orbita, 2007
Migla (Fog). Rīga: Mansards, 2012.
Vai otrā grupa mani dzird? (Can the Back Row Hear Me?). Rīga: Liels un mazs, 2014.
Lieldienas (Easter). Rīga: Neputns, 2018.
Nakts (Night). Rīga: Mansards, 2021.

Prose
Stikli (Glass Shards). Novel. Rīga: Dienas Grāmata, 2016.
Neredzamie (Invisible). Novel. Rīga: Zvaigzne ABC, 2018.
Piena ceļi (Milky ways). Stories. Rīga: Mansards, 2018.
Skaistās (The Beauties). Novel. Rīga: Dienas grāmata, 2019.
Rakstītāja (The Writer). Novel. Rīga: Dienas grāmata, 2020.

Plays
Āda (Skin). Rīga: Dirty Deal Teatro, 2011.
Mūsu Silvija debesīs (Our Sylvia, Who Art in Heaven). Rīga: Ģertrūdes ielas teātris, 2013.
Trauki (The Dishes), in collaboration with Marta E. Martinsone. Rīga: Dirty Deal Teatro, 2014.

Works in translation
30 Questions People Don’t Ask: The Selected Poems of Inga Gaile. Translated in English by Ieva Lešinska. Warrensburg, Missouri: Pleiades Press; 2018. 
 Klaas (Glass Shards). Translated into Estonian by Aive Mandel. Tallinn: Looming, 2018.

Awards
The Annual Latvian Literary Award for Can the Back Row Hear Me?, 2015.
Prose Readings Award for the short story Piena ceļi/ Milky Ways, 2012.
Latvju Teksti Magazine Award for Fog, 2012.
Ojārs Vācietis Award for Fog, 2012.
Poetry Days Award for Cake Mary, 2007.
Ojārs Vācietis Award for Cry Not Laugh, 2004.
Anna Dagda Foundation Award for Cry Not Laugh, 2004.
Klāvs Elsbergs Award for Time Had Grown Enamoured, 1999.

References

External links
Inga Gaile interview
 Inga Gaile piedalīsies ASV Nacionālajā grāmatu festivālā un #iamintrovert karikatūru izstādes atklāšanā
 Ryan translates poems by Inga Gaile and Baiba Damberg in Words About Words | Ryan Van Winkle

1976 births
Living people
Writers from Riga
20th-century Latvian poets
20th-century Latvian women writers
21st-century Latvian poets
21st-century Latvian women writers
21st-century dramatists and playwrights
Latvian dramatists and playwrights
Women dramatists and playwrights
Latvian Academy of Culture alumni